May Hong is a Korean-American model, actress, and artist. She has most notably modeled for designers including Eckhaus Latta, Marc Jacobs, and Gucci. As an actress, Hong has appeared on High Maintenance, Hacks, and Tales of the City.

Life and career 
Hong was born in South Korea and immigrated to the United States at age six. She was raised in Flushing, Queens, New York. Hong attended high school at Fiorello LaGuardia High School, where she studied art and cultivated an interest in printmaking. She received her bachelor of fine arts degree in printmaking from RISD.

Hong moved to Brooklyn after graduation and managed a photography studio. Her modeling career began when her friends Mike Eckhaus and Zoe Latta asked her to model for their fledgling brand in 2011. She continued modeling and eventually began to do commercials. She has modeled for designers including Adidas, Marni, Gucci, Telfar, and Marc Jacobs. She has also walked New York Fashion Week. Hong has walked in every Eckhaus Latta runway show.

She has acted in the television shows Broad City, High Maintenance, New Amsterdam, and Hacks, and the film Adam. Her first lead acting role was in the Netflix revival series Tales of the City (2019) as Margot Park.

Hong resides in Brooklyn.

References

External links 
 May Hong on Models.com
 May Hong on Instagram
 

Year of birth missing (living people)
Living people
21st-century American women artists
21st-century American actresses
American models of Korean descent
American female models
Female models from New York (state)
Rhode Island School of Design alumni
Artists from New York City
Actors from New York City
People from Flushing, Queens
Fiorello H. LaGuardia High School alumni